Acraea hypoleuca, the Namibian acraea, is a butterfly in the family Nymphalidae. It is found in Namibia.

Description

A. hypoleuca Trim. Expanse about 60 mm. Wings above orange-red; forewing above with dark marginal band, which encloses 8 large light marginal spots; discal dots in 1 b to 6, all rounded, that in 1 b near the distal margin, those in 2 to 4 in a line, those in 4 to 6 also in a line, placed almost vertically to the preceding; beneath as above, but with whitish subapical band. Hindwing above with white-spotted marginal band 2 mm. in breadth and distinct discal spots, beneath marked as above but with whitish ground colour and larger white marginal spots. Seems to be nearly allied to A. chilo and Acraea zetes. The only known specimen probably came from German South-West Africa.

Biology
The habitat consists of gullies and granite outcrops.

Adults have been recorded feeding on the flowers of Psilocaulon species and Calicorema capitata. They are on wing from December to June.

The larvae feed on Adenia pechuelli. The final instar larvae are pale silvery grey with four large purplish black spots across each segment. The head is orange with pale ochreous marks.

Taxonomy
It is a member of the Acraea zetes species group -   but see also Pierre & Bernaud, 2014

References

External links

Images representing Acraea hypoleuca at Bold

Butterflies described in 1898
hypoleuca
Endemic fauna of Namibia
Butterflies of Africa
Taxa named by Roland Trimen